Jaroslav Hübl (born 29 December 1982 in Ústí nad Labem) is a Czech professional ice hockey goaltender currently an unrestricted free agent who most recently played with Italian club, HCB South Tyrol of the Austrian Hockey League (EBEL). He previously played with Ilves in the Finnish SM-liiga before joining Bolzano. He originally played with professionally with HC Litvínov of the Czech Extraliga. On August 18, 2014, Hübl opted to remain with defending EBEL champions, HC Bolzano, signing a one-year contract.

His father Jaroslav and cousin Viktor were also professionals in the sport.

References

External links 
 
 

1982 births
Bolzano HC players
BK Mladá Boleslav players
Czech ice hockey goaltenders
HC Davos players
Ilves players
HC Kometa Brno players
HC Litvínov players
Living people
Piráti Chomutov players
SCL Tigers players
Sportspeople from Ústí nad Labem
Czech expatriate ice hockey players in Germany
Czech expatriate ice hockey players in Switzerland
Czech expatriate ice hockey players in Finland
Czech expatriate sportspeople in Italy
Expatriate ice hockey players in Italy